Mark Chamberlain (born 12 May 1961) is a New Zealand former cricketer. He played in one first-class match for Canterbury in 1988/89.

See also
 List of Canterbury representative cricketers

References

External links
 

1961 births
Living people
New Zealand cricketers
Canterbury cricketers
People from Leeston
Cricketers from Canterbury, New Zealand